Varlamovo is a rural locality (a village) in Kharovskoye Rural Settlement, Kharovsky District, Vologda Oblast, Russia. The population was 9 as of 2002.

Geography 
Varlamovo is located 24 km northwest of Kharovsk (the district's administrative centre) by road. Sinyakovo is the nearest rural locality.

References 

Rural localities in Kharovsky District
Kadnikovsky Uyezd